Pan Asia Banking Corporation PLC is a public limited company incorporated in Sri Lanka. The bank currently has 85 branches across Sri Lanka. A public limited liability company incorporated in Sri Lanka on 6 March 1995 under the Companies Act No. 17 of 1982 and re-registered under the Companies Act No.07 of 2007. A licensed commercial bank under the banking Act No.30 of 1988 and listed in the Colombo Stock Exchange. PABC's major shareholder is Dhammika Perera. Fitch Rating BBB- (lka) - Outlook 'Stable'.

References 

Pan Asia Bank lauded by Bangladesh central bank for preventing world’s largest bank heist
Pan Asia Bank strengthens its digital banking offerings with a new enhanced internet banking platform

External links 
 Official website

Banks of Sri Lanka
Banks established in 1995
Companies listed on the Colombo Stock Exchange
Sri Lankan companies established in 1995